During the 1998–99 English football season, Sunderland A.F.C. competed in the Football League First Division.

Season summary
In the 1998–99 season, Sunderland secured their Premier League place by winning the Division One title with a then record 105 League points having topped the First Division table since 24 October 1998. They clinched promotion on 13 April 1999 by winning 5–2 at Bury.

Final league table

Results
Sunderland's score comes first

Legend

Football League First Division

FA Cup

League Cup

Players

First-team squad
Squad at end of season

Appearances and goals

|-
! colspan=14 style=background:#dcdcdc; text-align:center| Goalkeepers

|-
! colspan=14 style=background:#dcdcdc; text-align:center| Defenders

|-
! colspan=14 style=background:#dcdcdc; text-align:center| Midfielders

|-
! colspan=14 style=background:#dcdcdc; text-align:center| Forwards

|-
|}

References

Notes

Sunderland A.F.C. seasons
Sunderland